Gideon W. Thompson (February 28, 1823 – January 8, 1902) was a colonel in the Missouri State Guard and the Confederate Army during the American Civil War. He assumed command on the field after the fall of Brigadier General John T. Hughes at the First Battle of Independence.

Early life
Gideon W. Thompson was born in Todd County, Kentucky to Robert C. Thompson and Eveline (Roberts).  They relocated to Howard County, Missouri while Gideon was a toddler.  Gideon became a farmer and livestock trader in Platte County, Missouri.

Civil War
At the outbreak of the Civil War, Thompson was elected captain of a company in the 5th Division of the Missouri State Guard. Serving in the major battles of Price's 1861 Missouri campaign he was elected major then colonel in November 1861.  In August 1862 he was recruiting a new regiment in Missouri and suffered a wound to the foot or leg at the First Battle of Independence.

Thompson was appointed Colonel of the 6th Missouri Cavalry (Confederate) November 9, 1862 as a result of John T. Coffee's removal from command on charges of drunkenness.  The regiment participated in three large Missouri raids in 1863, including the Battle of Hartville and the defense of Little Rock, Arkansas.  At the Battle of Hartville, he was reported as doing his duty "well and nobly" while commanding his regiment. After the Battle of Hartville, he was mistakenly reported dead in enemy communications by Union Brigadier General Fitz Henry Warren. After his many exploits during these campaigns, a command reorganization in December 1863 resulted in his replacement by another commander.

Post-war
At the close of hostilities, Thompson returned to his farm in Platte County, Missouri.  He died January 8, 1902 and is buried in the Barry Cemetery in Clay County, Missouri.

References

See also
Allardice, Bruce S., Confederate Colonels: a Biographical Register Columbia, MO: University of Missouri Press, 2008.
Eakin, Joanne Chiles, Battle of Independence, August 11, 1862, Independence, MO: Two Trails Publishing, 2000
Eakin, Joanne Chiles, Battle of Lone Jack, August 16, 1862, Independence, MO: Two Trails Publishing, 2001
Peterson, Richard C.; McGhee, James C.; Lindberg, Kip A.; & Daleen, Keith I., Sterling Price's Lieutenants, Rev. Ed., Independence, MO: Two Trails Publishing, 2007
McGhee, James E., Guide to Missouri Confederate Units, 1861-1865, University of Arkansas, 2010
Paxton, William M., Annals of Platte County, Missouri: From its Exploration Down to June 1, 1897, Platte County, MO: Hudson-Kimberly Publishing Co., 1897

1823 births
1902 deaths
People of Missouri in the American Civil War
Confederate States Army officers